Jean-Pierre Romeu (born 15 April 1948) is a former French rugby union footballer. His position was fly-half. He was nicknamed Le Gaulois (The Gaul), for his moustache.

He first played for US Carmaux, in 1967/68. He moved afterwards to ASM Clermont Auvergne, where he played from 1968/69 to 1980/81. He won the Challenge Yves du Manoir, in 1976, and he was runners-up to the French Championship in 1977/78.

He had 34 caps for France, from 1972 to 1977, scoring 4 tries, 27 conversions, 56 penalties and 9 drop goals, on an aggregate of 265 points. He is the sixth highest point scorer for the French international team. He played in five competitions of the Five Nations Championship, in 1973, being winner ex-aequo, 1974, 1975, 1976 and 1977, winning once again. He was the top scorer at the 1976 Five Nations Championship.

Honours 
 Selected to represent France, 1972-1977 (247 pts in 34 tests)
 Challenge Yves du Manoir 1976 with ASM Clermont Auvergne
 French championship finalist 1976 with ASM Clermont Auvergne

References

External links

French rugby records

1948 births
Living people
French rugby union players
France international rugby union players
Rugby union fly-halves